The 2017–18 Texas A&M Aggies men's basketball team represented Texas A&M University in the 2017–18 NCAA Division I men's basketball season. The team's head coach Billy Kennedy was in his seventh season at Texas A&M. The Aggies played their home games at Reed Arena in College Station, Texas in their sixth season as members of the Southeastern Conference. They finished the season 22–13, 9–9 in SEC play to finish in a tie for seventh place. They lost in the second round of the SEC tournament to Alabama. They received an at-large bid to the NCAA tournament where they defeated Providence and defending champion North Carolina to advance to the Sweet Sixteen where they lost to Michigan.

Previous season
The Aggies finished the 2016–17 season 16–15, 8–10 in SEC play to finish in a tie for ninth place. They lost in the second round of the SEC tournament to Vanderbilt.

Offseason

Departures

Incoming transfers

2017 recruiting class

2018 recruiting class

Roster

Schedule and results

|-
!colspan=12 style=|Exhibition

|-
!colspan=12 style=|Regular season

|-
!colspan=12 style=|  SEC Tournament

|-
!colspan=12 style=|  NCAA Tournament

Ranking movement

^Coaches did not release a Week 2 poll.
*AP does not release post-NCAA Tournament rankings

References

Texas A&M Aggies men's basketball seasons
Texas AandM
Texas AandM